George Patten "Pat" Reiffenstein (later Carr, March 23, 1883 – June 9, 1932) was a Canadian rower who competed in the 1904 Summer Olympics.

He was born in Carleton County, Ontario. In 1904 he was a member of Canadian boat, which won the silver medal in the men's eight. Only two teams, however, competed in the event. He changed his last name to Carr following World War I and died in Whitby, Ontario in 1932.

References

External links
George Reiffenstein's profile at databaseOlympics

1883 births
1932 deaths
Rowers from Ontario
Canadian male rowers
Olympic rowers of Canada
Rowers at the 1904 Summer Olympics
Olympic silver medalists for Canada
Olympic medalists in rowing
Medalists at the 1904 Summer Olympics